The Northern Homily Cycle is a Middle English poem written c. 1315. The poem consists of approximately 20,000 rhyming, octosyllabic lines. It features a Middle English retelling of the Gospel in verse form, alongside stories to illustrate the points of the verses and messages. Many of these illustrative stories use familiar, agricultural examples, calling to mind Chaucer's tales.

The work is anonymous, however the text suggests that the author "wrote in his native dialect and was well versed in the lore of the north country."

A good copy of it can be found in Oxford Bodleian Eng. Poet. a.1, a 14th-century manuscript.

A Cambridge manuscript of the poem has been edited by Saara Nevanlinna.

References

Middle English poems